Ashley Slanina-Davies (born 18 December 1989) is an English actress born in Standish, near Wigan, who is notable for playing the role of Amy Barnes in the Channel 4 soap opera, Hollyoaks. The role of Amy was Slanina-Davies' first major television role.

Hollyoaks
The character of Amy Barnes developed in a number of storylines in Autumn 2006, which saw the character discover she had become pregnant and her family break up. Dealing with these issues saw the character act erratically, becoming involved in a car crash.  Her character was written out of Hollyoaks in the episode broadcast on 8 August 2012, when she decides to take up a full-time course in Manchester.

In May 2016, it was announced that Slanina-Davies would be returning to Hollyoaks on a full-time basis later in the year. 

In January 2017, Digital Spy reported that Slanina-Davies' character Amy was being killed off in a "devastating" and "dark" storyline that Hollyoaks will air in late March. Slanina-Davies continued to appear in flashbacks throughout the storyline of Amy's murder and last appeared on screen on 8 September 2017 when an unknown assailant seemingly killed her.

Personal life
Slanina-Davies is interested in charity work, and has contributed to fundraising activities for the Action for Blind People charity as well as abseiling down the Printworks building in Manchester in June 2006. Slanina-Davies stated that she was motivated by the fact that her "mum's partially sighted".  

In May 2008, Slanina-Davies had her hair cut short for a storyline in Hollyoaks, while also raising money for cancer charity CLIC Sargent.  The haircut was part of a domestic violence storyline involving Ashley's character, Amy, and her abusive boyfriend Ste Hay, played by Kieron Richardson.

Filmography

Television

References

External links

1989 births
Living people
British actresses
British television actresses
People from Standish, Greater Manchester
English soap opera actresses